Thierry Vandal is a Canadian businessman. He has been the President and Chief Executive Officer of Hydro-Québec since 2005. Vandal announced in January 2015 that he was stepping down front his role and is scheduled to leave on May 1, 2015.

Early life and education 

Vandal holds an engineering degree from École polytechnique (Université de Montréal, 1982) and an MBA from HEC Montréal (Université de Montréal, 1995).

Career 

Prior to joining Hydro-Quebec in November 1996, Vandal worked for Shell Canada Limitée from 1982 to 1988 and for Société Pétrochimique Kemtec from 1988 to 1991.

While at Hydro-Quebec, Vandal served as Vice President–Strategic Planning and Business Development (1996–2001), President of Hydro-Québec Production (2001–2005) and finally President and Chief Executive Officer of Hydro-Québec (2005–2015).

Board membership 

He is or was the board member of the following organizations:

 Société d’énergie de la Baie James and Hydro-Québec International (Chairman of the Board)
 BioFuelNet Canada (Chairman of the Board)
 HEC Montréal
 McGill University
 Royal Bank of Canada
 TransCanada Corporation

Social involvement 

Thierry Vandal is a member of the Board of Governors of Centraide.

Honors 

2012 Canadian Energy Person of the Year award by the Canadian Energy Council

References

Living people
Canadian businesspeople
Year of birth missing (living people)
People named in the Paradise Papers